Selale  (also known as Selalesh), was a sub-province of the Ethiopian Empire located in modern day Shewa in or neighboring Grarya and associated with Bulga prior to the Oromo expansion into the region. The region was home to the important Debre Libanos monastery built by Saint Tekle Haymanot. Also known as Salale or Selalle, an Oromo subgroup inhabiting the West Shewa Zone, north Shewa Zone and  East Shewa Zone of Oromo Region, Ethiopia, are named after the original region. They have a population of approximately 2 million. The famous saint Tekle Haymanot was born in Zorare, a district in Selale which lied on the eastern edge of Shewa, to a Christian Amhara family.

See also 
 Shewa

References 

Ethiopian Empire
Shewa